Portsdown is a  biological Site of Special Scientific Interest on Portsdown Hill, on the northern outskirts of Portsmouth in Hampshire.

This is a linear south-facing escarpment with a rich chalk grassland flora. The diverse insect fauna includes all the chalk downland butterflies and a population of the largest British bush cricket, Tettigonia viridissima. On the lower slopes, raised beaches indicate former sea levels.

References

 
Sites of Special Scientific Interest in Hampshire